The 50th National Film Awards, presented by Directorate of Film Festivals, the organisation set up by Ministry of Information and Broadcasting, India to felicitate the best of Indian Cinema released in the year 2002.

Awards were announced by the committee headed by Prakash Jha, Rajiv Mehrotra and Udaya Tara Nayar for the feature films, non-feature films and books written on Indian cinema, respectively, on 26 July 2003; whereas the award ceremony took place on 29 December 2003 and awards were given away by then President of India, A. P. J. Abdul Kalam.

Awards 

Awards were divided into feature films, non-feature films and books written on Indian cinema.

Lifetime Achievement Award

Feature films 

Feature films were awarded at All India as well as regional level. For 50th National Film Awards, a Bengali film, Mondo Meyer Upakhyan won the National Film Award for Best Feature Film; whereas a Tamil film, Kannathil Muthamittal won the maximum number of awards (6). Following were the awards given in each category:

Juries 

A committee headed by Prakash Jha was appointed to evaluate the feature films awards. Following were the jury members:

 Jury Members
Prakash Jha (Chairperson)Amitabh ParasharArun KaulBiju ViswanathBiplab Roy ChowdharyDinyar Contractor
Gautam KaulK. S. L. SwamyKiran GhaiAlex MathewManoj TiwariMrinal Kanti DasMukesh Khanna
Nasir Mahmood QuraishiNirad N. MohapatraShyamaprasadRauf AhmedS. Theodore Baskaran
Saibal ChattopadhyaySreelekha MukherjiSwapan MallickZoobi Amir

All India Award 

Following were the awards given:

Golden Lotus Award 

Official Name: Swarna Kamal

All the awardees are awarded with 'Golden Lotus Award (Swarna Kamal)', a certificate and cash prize.

Silver Lotus Award 

Official Name: Rajat Kamal

All the awardees are awarded with 'Silver Lotus Award (Rajat Kamal)', a certificate and cash prize.

Regional Awards 

The award is given to best film in the regional languages in India.

Best Feature Film in Each of the Language Other Than Those Specified in the Schedule VIII of the Constitution

Non-Feature Films 

Short Films made in any Indian language and certified by the Central Board of Film Certification as a documentary/newsreel/fiction are eligible for non-feature film section.

Juries 

A committee headed by Rajiv Mehrotra was appointed to evaluate the non-feature films awards. Following were the jury members:

 Jury Members
 Rajiv Mehrotra (Chairperson)Apurba SharmaKanan KrishnamurthySatya NarayanSatya Prakash 'Aseem'

Golden Lotus Award 

Official Name: Swarna Kamal

All the awardees are awarded with 'Golden Lotus Award (Swarna Kamal)', a certificate and cash prize.

Silver Lotus Award 

Official Name: Rajat Kamal

All the awardees are awarded with 'Silver Lotus Award (Rajat Kamal)' and cash prize.

Best Writing on Cinema 

The awards aim at encouraging study and appreciation of cinema as an art form and dissemination of information and critical appreciation of this art-form through publication of books, articles, reviews etc.

Juries 

A committee headed by Udaya Tara Nayar was appointed to evaluate the writing on Indian cinema. Following were the jury members:

 Jury Members
 Udaya Tara Nayar (Chairperson)Om ThanviRashmi Doraiswamy

Golden Lotus Award 

Official Name: Swarna Kamal

All the awardees are awarded with 'Golden Lotus Award (Swarna Kamal)' and cash prize.

Special Mention 

All the award winners are awarded with Certificate of Merit.

Awards not given 

Following were the awards not given as no film was found to be suitable for the award:

 Best Film on Family Welfare
 Best Film on Environment / Conservation / Preservation
 Best Feature Film in Manipuri
 Best Feature Film in Oriya
 Best Feature Film in Punjabi
 Best Feature Film in Telugu
 Best Scientific Film
 Best Agricultural Film
 Best Historical Reconstruction / Compilation Film
 Best Educational / Motivational / Instructional Film
 Best Exploration / Adventure Film
 Best Investigative Film
 Best Animation Film
 Best Non-Feature Film Cinematography
 Best Non-Feature Film Audiography

References

External links 
 National Film Awards Archives
 Official Page for Directorate of Film Festivals, India

National Film Awards (India) ceremonies
2003 Indian film awards